{{DISPLAYTITLE:C18H20ClNO2}}
The molecular formula C18H20ClNO2 may refer to:

 α-Chlorocodide, an opioid analog that is a derivative of codeine
 β-Chlorocodide, an opioid analog and isomer of α-chlorocodide
 SKF-83,959, a synthetic benzazepine derivative

Molecular formulas